Vincent "Vince" Gregory (born July 20, 1948) is a politician from the state of Michigan. From 2011 to 2019, he represented the 11th Senate district in the Michigan Senate. The district, which is located in southern Oakland County, includes Southfield, Farmington Hills, Farmington, Ferndale and Oak Park.

Biography
Gregory, who is African American, was born on July 20, 1948, in Detroit, Michigan, to Laurence and Dorothy Gregory.  He was the second eldest of five children, and had three brothers, Laurence, Timothy, and Delbert, and a sister, Patricia.  He attended Dundee High School in Dundee, Michigan, in Monroe County.  After graduating from high school in 1966, he began attending Madonna University, a Catholic college in Livonia, Michigan.

However, his schooling was interrupted in April 1968 when he was drafted into the United States Marine Corps.  He was shipped to Vietnam in November 1968, where he would serve until November 1969.  In 1970, Gregory was honorably discharged.

In 1973, Gregory joined the Wayne County Sheriff's Department, where he attained the rank of Corporal and then Detective.  In 1983, he was elected Vice President of the Local 502 SEIU, AFL-CIO Union.  He ran for President of the Union in 1993, won, and served as President until 2000.  In 2003, he retired from the Wayne County Sheriff's Department.

In 2005, Gregory returned to Madonna University to complete his schooling that was interrupted by his service in Vietnam.  He graduated with a Bachelor of Science Degree in Criminal Justice in May 2006. Gregory married his wife, Yvonne, in 1978.  They live in Southfield and have six adult children, Lawrence, Troi, Vanessa, Vincent II (deceased), Cortney, and Kristen.  They have five grandchildren, one of them being Eric Gregory.

Political career
In 1998, Gregory ran for a seat on the Oakland County Commission.  He won and served as Commissioner for the 21st district, which included northeast Southfield, Lathrup Village, and Berkley.

In 2008, Gregory announced his candidacy for the 35th State House district, vacated by fellow Democrat Paul Condino, who was term limited.  The district includes Southfield, Lathrup Village, Royal Oak Township and part of Oak Park.  Gregory won the Democratic Primary with about 60% of the vote and went on to easily defeat Republican Katie Koppin in the 2008 General Election.  He received 41,017 votes, more than any other candidate for the State House of Representatives in Michigan.  The 35th district is majority African American and overwhelmingly Democratic.

After one term in the state house, Gregory was elected to the State Senate, succeeding term-limited Democrat Gilda Jacobs.  In 2013, Gregory announced his candidacy for U.S Congress from Michigan's 14th congressional district, but withdrew from the race in April, 2014.

In 2018, there was speculation that he would be the running mate of then candidate for Governor, Gretchen Whitmer, but Garlin Gilchrist was chosen instead.

Gregory was a candidate for Oakland County Sheriff in the 2020 general election.

Electoral history
2008 election for State House
Vincent Gregory (D), 88%
Katie Koppin (R), 11%
2008 Democratic Primary election for State House
Vincent Gregory (D), 60%
Faith Shepherd (D), 34%

References

External links
Official website

1948 births
Living people
Democratic Party members of the Michigan House of Representatives
Madonna University alumni
African-American state legislators in Michigan
Politicians from Detroit
Democratic Party Michigan state senators
21st-century American politicians
People from Southfield, Michigan
People from Dundee, Michigan
Christians from Michigan
21st-century African-American politicians
20th-century African-American people